Svinalängorna may refer to:

 Svinalängorna (novel), a 2006 novel by Susanna Alakoski
 Beyond (2010 film), film adaption of the novel